The Amphitheatre is a 1965 Argentine film directed by René Múgica.

Cast 
Alfredo Alcón
Fina Basser
Rafael Chumbito - Hombre en reñidero
Milagros de la Vega
Francisco de Paula
Rafael Diserio - Hombre en velorio
Zelmar Gueñol
Lautaro Murúa
Haydée Padilla
Lola Palombo
Francisco Petrone
Carlos Daniel Reyes - Zárate
Jorge Salcedo
Myriam de Urquijo

External links 

1965 films
Argentine drama films
Films directed by René Múgica
1960s Argentine films